Hubertus (Huib) van Hove (13 May 1814, in The Hague – 14 November 1865? Antwerp) was a Dutch painter, the son of Bartholomeus van Hove (1790–1880) and a teacher of some artists who became members of the Hague School.

Hubertus or Huib van Hove was taught painting not only by his father, but also by Hendrik van de Sande Bakhuyzen. In his father's studio, he worked with Johannes Bosboom and together they worked on the pieces of scenery that Bartholomeus van Hove created for the Royal Theatre in The Hague.

Hubertus started as a landscape painter, but his best work was not in that style. His love of color and bright light was best displayed in his doorkijkjes, or domestic vistas, in the style of Pieter de Hooch.  These were views of outdoor light seen through an interior, a room or kitchen situated between the street door and an inner yard. Teyler's Museum possesses an excellent specimen in The Knitter, a picture which is of a lively composition and shows an inclination for a stronger and fresher coloring than prevailed in Van Hove's day.

Among his pupils were Jacob Maris, Christoffel Bisschop, Johannes Anthonie Balthasar Stroebel, Maurits Leon (1838–1865) and Hendricus Johannes Scheeres (1823–1864), who continued his master's teaching in his Armourer and Linen-shop and who enjoyed the appreciation of his brother artists.

Sources
Marius, Gerharda Hermina, Dutch Painters of the 19th Century, The Antique Collectors' Club, Woodbridge, Suffolk
Hove, Huib van (Bz) at the Netherlands Institute for Art History.

External links

 
Examples of his works.
More examples of his work.
Dutch Art in the Nineteenth Century/The Forerunners of the Hague School.

19th-century Dutch painters
Dutch male painters
1814 births
1865 deaths
Artists from The Hague
19th-century Dutch male artists